St Michael's Church, Breaston is a Grade I listed parish church in the Church of England in Breaston, Derbyshire.

History

The church dates from the 11th century, but is mostly 14th and 15th century. The roofs were raised in the 16th century. A restoration took place in 1871 by Robert Evans of Nottingham where the old box pews were replaced with new seating, and choir stalls were provided. The west gallery was removed. The floor was laid with boards under the seating, red quarry tiles in the aisles, and May and Co encaustic tiles laid in the chancel. The south aisle roof was re-leaded. The Rector provided a small stained glass window featuring St Michael, which was designed and installed by Heaton, Butler and Bayne. It was restored between 1895 and 1899 by Robert Evans and Son who also added a new vestry. The contractor was C Baines of Newark.

Parish status
The church is in a joint parish with 
St Chad's Church, Church Wilne
St Mary's Church, Draycott

Organ

The pipe organ was built by Nigel Church and dates from 1975. A specification of the organ can be found on the National Pipe Organ Register.

See also
Grade I listed churches in Derbyshire
Listed buildings in Breaston

References

Church of England church buildings in Derbyshire
Grade I listed churches in Derbyshire